Melbourne tram route 75 is operated by Yarra Trams on the Melbourne tram network from Vermont South to Central Pier. The 22.8 kilometre route is operated out of Camberwell depot with A and B class trams. It is the longest route on the network.

History

The origins of route 75 lie in separate tram lines, Australia's first cable tram from Bourke Street to Hawthorn Bridge and a horse tram from Hawthorn Bridge to Auburn Road, which was converted to an electric line and extended over many years to its current terminus at Vermont South.

The first cable tram line opened by the Melbourne Tramway & Omnibus Company was from Bourke Street to Hawthorn Bridge along Spencer Street, Flinders Street, Wellington Parade and Bridge Road opened on 11 November 1885. On 27 January 1889 a horse tram from Hawthorn Bridge to Auburn Road, travelling via Burwood Road, Power Street and Riversdale Road was opened.

The Hawthorn Tramways Trust (HTT) closed the horse tramway for conversion to electric traction on 31 January 1916, with the electric line opening in two stages; Power Street to Auburn Road along Riversdale Road opening on 7 May 1916, and from Hawthorn Bridge to Riversdale Road along Burwood Road and Power Street on 21 June 1916.

The Riversdale Road line was extended by the HTT to Bowen Street, Camberwell along Riversdale Road and Camberwell Road, passing through Camberwell Junction, opening on 31 May 1916, it was extended again to Boundary Road (now Warrigal Road) along Camberwell Road and Norwood Road (now Toorak Road) on 10 June 1916.

The Melbourne & Metropolitan Tramways Board (MMTB) converted the Bourke Street to Hawthorn Bridge cable line to electric traction in three stages, closing the line on 29 June 1927. Reopening with electric trams running from Lonsdale Street, a short electric extension to the previous cable terminus of Bourke Street, to Swanston Street on 14 July 1927, from Swanston Street to Simpson Street on 17 September 1927, and Simpson Street to Hawthorn Bridge on 4 December 1927.

The line's City terminus was extended slightly north to terminate at La Trobe Street, when the MMTB opened the La Trobe Street line on 15 January 1951.

On 19 July 1978, the route was extended 3.4 kilometres from Warrigal Road to Middleborough Road, Burwood East, and on 8 July 1993 to Blackburn Road.

During the 1999 election campaign, the Labor State Opposition committed to extend route 75 to Knox City Shopping Centre. Labor won the election, but the line was only extended to its current terminus at Vermont South on 23 July 2005, with a connecting route 732 bus operated by Ventura Bus Lines. At 22.8 kilometres, it became the longest line on the network.

The Public Transport Users Association has campaigned for the line to be extended to its originally proposed terminus.

On 26 January 2014, the tram was changed to terminate at Central Pier and no longer serving Spencer Street. In January 2016, route 75 began operating through the night on Fridays and Saturdays as part of the Night Network.

Route
Route 75 runs Central Pier along Flinders Street and continues past Flinders Street station, St Paul's Cathedral, and Federation Square, entering East Melbourne east along Wellington Parade and into Richmond continuing east on Bridge Road.

At Hawthorn Bridge it crosses the Yarra River into Hawthorn and continues east on Burwood Road, it briefly travels south on Power Street before turning east into Riversdale Road, traversing Hawthorn and Hawthorn East. At Camberwell Junction it crosses Burke Road and travels south east along Camberwell Road.

It enters Toorak Road and heads east, at Warrigal Road Toorak Road becomes the Burwood Highway, it continues east, past Deakin University and through Burwood East, to its terminus in Vermont South.

Operation
Route 75 is operated out of Camberwell depot with B class trams, although A class trams are occasionally used.

Controversy over accessibility

During the extension of the route from Burwood to Vermont South, all new stops were constructed as wheelchair accessible, low-floor platforms, with many other stops along the route converted to accessible platforms.

There has been controversy in the local newspaper, as even though the platforms are wheelchair accessible, the route is operated with high floor trams with steps. The upgrade has been criticised as a waste of money, because passengers using wheelchairs and other mobility-impaired passengers are still limited from accessing trams on the route.

Route map

References

External links

075
075
1916 establishments in Australia
Transport in the City of Whitehorse
Transport in the City of Boroondara
Transport in the City of Yarra